Mikhail Yuryevich Kotlyarov (born 19 June 1963 in Azov, USSR) is a Russian classical crossover tenor and recording artist.

Biography 

Mikhail Kotlyarov was born in 1963 in the city Azov, Rostov region. The Military service of Mikhail Kotlyarov was twice: in the Krasnoznamyonnii singing and dancing ensemble of the Soviet Army lead by S. A. Alexandrov and in the song and dance ensemble of the air defense forces. After he finished service, Mikhail worked in a children’s musical theater.

In 2005 with the academic Russian chorus in the name of A.V. Sveshnikov and the Big Symphonic orchestra Mikhail Kotlyarov recorded arias of J. Rossini. And after that he made an unforgettable performance in the Italian city of Florence.

The next important step in the work of the musician was a joint project with the American musician and producer Walter Afanasieff. In the list of his «Star» clients were such names as Whitney Huston, Celine Dion, Michael Jackson, Mariah Carey and many other popular musicians. After several months of collaboration Kotlyarov and Afanasieff released one more record «IN ONE BREATH» («V odno dikhanie»). It was a fantastic success. Randy Jackson, an American bass player, vocalist, art manager and the creator of the top-rated show «American Idol», Emmy Award winner, helped with the promotion and sales of the album.

In October 2015, another album of the Russian musician was released. The album was called «Mikhail Kotlaroff – Unity of Variety.

Performances 
 The Natalya Sats Musical Theater
 Opéra Bastille, Hermann´s part in The Queen of Spades, Pinkerton´s part in Madame Butterfly
 Théâtre du Capitole in Toulouse
 Grand Théâtre de Genève, Nemorino´s part in L'élisir d'ámore
 Théâtre des Champs-Élysées
 La Scala, Cavaradossi's part in Tosca
 Solo concert in the House of the Unions
 Reims Cathedral (in chorus)
 Solo concert in Moscow Conservatory
 Belcanto Festival, Orombello's part in Beatrice di Tenda
 Yves Saint Laurent show
 Belvedere Festival
 Solo concert in Palais Schwarzenberg
 Concert program in Thailand
 Concert in Monaco by request of Albert, II
 Concert on Victory Day
 Solo concert in State Kremlin Palace

Discography 
 1991: Arias, Moscow Convervatory
 1991:  Symphony No. 2 (Shostakovich)
 1991: Popular songs
 1993: 13 opera arias with a brass band
 2000: My Destiny
 2002: Remember and Help
 2007: In One Breathe
 2011: Unity of Variety
 2015: Independent label

Labels 
 Decca
 Melodiya 
 Philips
 Polygram

References

External links 
 
 Mikhail Kotlyarov Kremlin State Palace

Living people
1963 births
Russian tenors